Stephan Dorfmeister or, in Hungarian, Dorffmaister István (1729 – 29 May 1797) was a painter of German origin who worked primarily in Burgenland and Transdanubia (now part of Hungary).

Biography 
A birth year of 1729 is assumed, based on parish registers from the city of Ödenburg. Hungarian sources indicate that the year was 1725. He was born in Vienna, the eldest of the five children of Johann Christof Georg Dorfmeister (1705–1789) and his wife  Elisabeth, née Millner. His youngest brother was the Austrian sculptor, .

From 1769, he referred to himself as a "foreign" member of the academy, although there are no supporting documents.

After acquiring an expertise in fresco painting, c.1760, he received an order from the Provost of the Premonstratensian abbey in Gschirna for painting the monastery church. In 1761, he worked at the new monastery in Türje. Around 1762, he moved to a home near Ödenburg, but never became a Bürger (citizen) there; possibly to avoid compulsory military service. During this time, he married Anna Franz and they had nine children together. After her death in 1790, he married Katharina Gillig.

he worked mainly in what is now Western Hungary. His primary customers were the Bishops of Steinamanger and Fünfkirchen, as well the region's numerous monasteries. He also had some clientele among the nobility. Many of the secular buildings he decorated have since been destroyed or demolished. About fifty portraits are known to be his.

His three eldest sons assisted in his workshop. The eldest of them, Stephan Joseph Dorfmeister the Younger (1764-1807) helped with projects in Sankt Gotthard. Many works created after 1797 were jointly signed. His next eldest, Joseph Paul Stephan Dorfmeister (born 1770), remained with him in his workshop and completed his last commission; the altarpiece at the church in Magotsch (1798).

Despite his thriving business, he was plagued by financial problems his entire life and left his family deeply in debt. He died in Ödenburg.

Selected works

References

Further reading 
 M. Fábián: Dorffmaister István múvészi munkássága a szombathelyi egyházmegyében (German: Stephen Dorffmaister künstlerische Arbeiten im Bistum Steinamanger), Szombathely, 1936.
 Gy. Géfin: A Szombathelyi székesegyház (German: Die Kathedrale von Steinamanger), Szombathely, 1945.
 L. Kostyál und M. Zsámbéky: Katalog "Stephanus Dorffmaister pinxit"; Gedenkausstellung von Stephan Dorffmaister, Szombathely, 1998.

External links

1729 births
1797 deaths
Austrian painters
History painters
Academy of Fine Arts Vienna alumni
Religious artists